The Inter Zone Women's One Day Competition was a List A women's cricket competition that took place in India between 2006–07 and 2013–14. The tournament involved five teams representing regions (or "zones") on India, playing in a round-robin 50-over league. The tournament was the successor to the Rani Jhansi Trophy, which ran until 2002–03 and also involved zonal sides, and was replaced by the Senior Women's Cricket Inter Zonal Three Day Game, a first-class competition using the same teams.

The most successful side in the history of the competition was Central Zone, who won 7 out of the 8 titles. North Zone won the other title, in 2011–12.

In 2022–23, a similar, expanded tournament was created, in the form of the 2022–23 Women's Senior Inter Zonal One Day.

Teams

Tournament results

References

Recurring sporting events established in 2007
List A cricket competitions
Indian domestic cricket competitions